The Ganda language or Luganda is a Bantu language spoken in the African Great Lakes region. It is one of the major languages in Uganda and is spoken by more than 10 million Baganda and other people principally in central Uganda, including the capital Kampala of Uganda. Typologically, it is an agglutinative, tonal language with subject–verb–object word order and nominative–accusative morphosyntactic alignment.

With at least more than 16 million first-language speakers in the Buganda region and 5 million others fluent elsewhere in different regions especially in major urban areas like Mbale, Tororo, Jinja, Gulu, Mbarara, Hoima, Kasese etc. Luganda is Uganda's defacto language of national identity as it's the most widely spoken Ugandan language used mostly in trade in urban areas, the language is also the most-spoken unofficial language in Rwanda's capital Kigali. As a second language, it follows English and  precedes Swahili in Uganda.

Lukooki is used in some primary schools in kooki as pupils begin to learn English, the primary official language of Uganda. Until the 1960s, lukooki was also the official language of Uganda till now  instruction in primary schools in Eastern Uganda.

Phonology 
A notable feature of Luganda phonology is its geminate consonants and distinctions between long and short vowels. Speakers generally consider consonantal gemination and vowel lengthening to be two manifestations of the same effect, which they call simply "doubling" or "stressing".

Luganda is also a tonal language; the change in the pitch of a syllable can change the meaning of a word.  For example, the word  means 'king' if all three syllables are given the same pitch.  If the first syllable is high then the meaning changes to 'the little one catches' (third person singular present tense Class VI - of - 'to catch').  This feature makes Luganda a difficult language for speakers of non-tonal languages to learn. A non-native speaker has to learn the variations of pitch by prolonged listening.

Unlike some other Bantu languages, there is no tendency in Luganda for penultimate vowels to become long; in fact they are very frequently short, as in the city name Kampala , pronounced , in which the second vowel is short in Luganda.

Vowels 

All five vowels have two forms: long and short. The distinction is phonemic but can occur only in certain positions. After two consonants, the latter being a semivowel, all vowels are long. The quality of a vowel is not affected by its length.

Long vowels in Luganda are very long, more than twice the length of a short vowel. A vowel before a prenasalised consonant, as in  'Buganda' is also lengthened, although it is not as long as a long vowel; laboratory measurements show that the vowel + nasal takes the same length of time to say as a long vowel. Before a geminate, all vowels are short.

Consonants 
The table below gives the consonant set of Luganda, grouping voiceless and voiced consonants together in a cell where appropriate, in that order.

Historically, geminated consonants appear to have arisen when a very close  between two consonants dropped out; for example - from *- 'run'.

The liquid  becomes  when geminated or prenasalised. For example,   'I see' (from the root - with the subject prefix -);   'leaf' (from the root - with the singular noun prefix -, which doubles the following consonant).

A consonant cannot be both geminated and prenasalised. When morphological processes require this, the gemination is dropped and the syllable  is inserted, which can then be prenasalised.

Note that this last example can be analysed in two ways, reflecting the fact that there is no distinction between prenasalisation and gemination when applied to nasal stops.

Tone

Luganda is a tonal language, with three tones: high, low and falling. There are, however, no syllables in Luganda with rising tone , since these automatically become .

According to one analysis, tones are carried on morae. In Luganda, a short vowel has one mora and a long vowel has two morae. A geminate or prenasalised consonant has one mora. A consonant + semivowel (e.g.  or ) also has one mora. A vowel followed by a prenasalised consonant has two morae including the one belonging to the prenasalised consonant. The initial vowel of words like  'book' is considered to have one mora, even though such vowels are often pronounced long. No syllable can have more than two morae.

Falling tones can be heard in syllables which have two morae, e.g. those with a long vowel ( 'to cry'), those with a short vowel followed by a geminate consonant ( 'to throb'), those with a vowel followed by a prenasalised consonant ( 'Baganda people'), and those following a consonant plus semivowel (  'to fall sick'). They can also be heard on final vowels, e.g.  'country'.

Words in Luganda commonly belong to one of three patterns (other patterns are less common): (a) toneless, e.g. 'book'; (b) with one high tone, e.g. (At the end of a sentence, the final tone becomes a falling tone, i.e. [Kámpálâ], but in other contexts, e.g. when the word is used as the subject of a sentence, it remains high:  'Kampala is a city'.)

Although words like  are theoretically toneless, they are generally subject to a tone-raising rule whereby all but the first mora acquire a high tone. Thus  'book' is pronounced  and  'school' is pronounced  (where the long consonant  counts as the first mora). These tones added to toneless words are called 'phrasal tones'. The tone-raising rule also applies to the toneless syllables at the end of words like   'hospital' and   'we are going', provided that there is at least one low-toned mora after the lexical tone. When this happens, the high tones which follow the low tone are slightly lower than the one which precedes it.

However, there are certain contexts, such as when a toneless word is used as the subject of a sentence or before a numeral, when this tone-raising rule does not apply:  'Masindi is a city';  'ten books'.

In a sentence, the lexical tones (that is, the high tones of individual words) tend to fall gradually in a series of steps from high to low. For example, in the sentence  'it is the chief city in Uganda', the lexical high tones of the syllables ,  and  stand out and gradually descend in pitch, the toneless syllables in between being lower. This phenomenon is called 'downdrift'.

However, there are certain types of phrase, notably those in the form 'noun + of + noun', or 'verb + location', where downdrift does not occur, and instead all the syllables in between the two lexical high tones link together into a 'plateau', in which all the vowels have tones of equal height, for example  'in the south of Uganda' or  'it is in Uganda'.

But a phrasal tone can and frequently does form a plateau with a following high tone of either sort. Again there are certain exceptions; for example, there is no plateau before the words  'this' or  'all':  'this person',  'all the people'.

Prefixes sometimes change the tones in a word. For example,   'they are Baganda' has LHHL, but adding the initial vowel   gives   'Baganda people' with LLHLH. (Here, long vowels are transcribed double rather than with the length mark, to allow for tones to be written on each mora.)

Different verb tenses have different tonal patterns. The tones of verbs are made more complicated by the fact that some verbs have a high tone on the first syllable of the root, while others do not, and also by the fact that the sequence HH generally becomes HL by a rule called Meeussen's rule. Thus  means 'he reads', but when the toneless prefix  'he/she' is replaced by the high-toned prefix  'they', instead of  it becomes  'they read'. The tones of verbs in relative clauses and in negative sentences differ from those in ordinary positive sentences and the addition of an object-marker such as  'him' adds further complications.

In addition to lexical tones, phrasal tones, and the tonal patterns of tenses, there are also intonational tones in Luganda, for example, tones of questions. One rather unexpected phenomenon for English speakers is that if a yes-no question ends in a toneless word, instead of a rise, there is a sharp drop in pitch, e.g.  'is this a road?'.

Phonotactics 
Syllables can take any of the following forms:
 V (only as the first syllable of a word)
 CV
 GV
 NCV
 CSV
 GSV
 NCSV
where V = vowel, C = single consonant (including nasals and semivowels but excluding geminates), G = geminate consonant, N = nasal stop, S = semivowel

These forms are subject to certain phonotactic restrictions:
 Two vowels may not appear adjacent to one another. When morphological or grammatical rules cause two vowels to meet, the first vowel is elided or reduced to a semivowel and the second is lengthened if possible.
 A vowel following a consonant–semivowel combination (except ) is always long, except at the end of a word. After  a vowel can be either long or short. At the end of a word, all vowels are pronounced short.
 A vowel followed by a nasal–plosive combination is always long.
 A vowel followed by a geminate is always short. This rule takes precedence over all the above rules.
 The velar plosives  and  may not appear before the vowel  or the semivowel . In this position they become the corresponding postalveolar affricates  and  respectively.
 The consonants ,  and  can't be geminated or prenasalised.
 A consonant can't be both geminated and prenasalised.

The net effect of this is that all Luganda words follow the general pattern of alternating consonant clusters and vowels, beginning with either but always ending in a vowel:
 (V)XVXV...XV
where V = vowel, X = consonant cluster, (V) = optional vowel

This is reflected in the syllabification rule that in writing, words are always hyphenated after a vowel (when breaking a word over two lines).

Variant pronunciations 

In speech, word-final vowels are often elided in these conditioning environments:

For example:
   'I'm dying' is pronounced 
   'don't ask me' may be pronounced ,  or 

However, there is considerable variation in this, and using one allophone instead of the other causes no ambiguity.

Alternative analysis 
Treating the geminate and prenasalised consonants as separate phonemes yields the expanded consonant set below:

This simplifies the phonotactic rules so that all syllables are of one of three forms:
 V (only as the first syllable of a word)
 CV
 CSV
where V = vowel, C = consonant (including geminate and prenasalised consonants), N = nasal stop, S = semivowel (i.e. either  or ).

Vowel length is then only distinctive before simple consonants (i.e. simple plosives, simple fricatives, simple nasals, approximants and liquids)—not before geminate or nasalised consonants or at the end of a word.

Orthography 

Luganda spelling, which has been standardized since 1947, uses a Latin alphabet, augmented with one new letter  and a digraph , which is treated as a single letter. It has a very high sound-to-letter correspondence: one letter usually represents one sound and vice versa.

The distinction between simple and geminate consonants is always represented explicitly: simple consonants are written single, and geminates are written double. The distinction between long and short vowels is always made clear from the spelling but not always explicitly: short vowels are always written single; long vowels are written double only if their length cannot be inferred from the context. Stress and tones are not represented in the spelling.

The following phonemes are always represented with the same letter or combination of letters:

The following phonemes can be represented with two letters or combinations of letters, with the alternation predictable from the context:

The following phonemes can be represented with two letters or combinations of letters, with unpredictable alternation between the two:

It is therefore possible to predict the pronunciation of any word (with the exception of stress and tones) from the spelling. It is also usually possible to predict the spelling of a word from the pronunciation. The only words where this is not possible are those that include one of the affricate–vowel combinations discussed above.

Note, however, that some proper names are not spelled as they are pronounced.

Vowels 

The five vowels in Luganda are spelt with the same letters as in many other languages (for example Spanish):

  
  
  
  
  

As mentioned above, the distinction between long and short vowels is phonemic and is therefore represented in the alphabet. Long vowels are written as double (when length cannot be inferred from the context) and short vowels are written single. For example:

   'four (e.g. people)' vs   'children'
   'dance' vs   'overcharge'
   'mingle' vs   'walk slowly'
   'do' vs   '(to) weed'
   'send' vs   '(to) name'

In certain contexts, phonotactic constraints mean that a vowel must be long, and in these cases it is not written double:
 A vowel followed by a prenasalised consonant

For example:
   'metal'
   'I go'
But
   'court house'
   'customs office'

Vowels at the start or end of the word are not written double, even if they are long.

Consonants 
The  combination is treated as a single letter and therefore doesn't have any effect on vowel length (see the previous subsection).

The following letters are pronounced approximately as in English:
   (sometimes softened to )
 d 
   ("'' and '' are pronounced with the lips slightly pouted")
  
  
  
  
  
  
  
   ("'' differs from the English 'w' being much softer")
  
  

A few letters have unusual values:
  
  
  
  

   'she's waiting'
   (or ) 'she's waiting for it'

There are also two letters whose pronunciation depends on the following letter:
As in the Romance languages the 'softening letter' (in Italian , in French , in Luganda ) is not itself pronounced, although in Luganda it does have the effect of lengthening the following vowel (see the previous subsection).

Alphabet 

The standard Luganda alphabet is composed of twenty-four letters:
 2 semi-vowels: , 

Since the last consonant  does not appear on standard typewriters or computer keyboards, it is often replaced by the combination ' (including the apostrophe).

In addition, the letter combination  is treated as a unique consonant.

Other letters are not used in the alphabet, but are often used to write loanwords from other languages. Most such loanwords have standardised spellings consistent with Luganda orthography (and therefore not using these letters), but these spelling are not often used, particularly for English words.

The full alphabet, including both standard Luganda letters and those used only for loanwords, is as follows:
 Aa, 
 Bb, 
 Cc, 
 Dd, 
 Ee, 
 Ff, 
 Gg, 
 (Hh)
 Ii, 
 Jj, 
 Kk, 
 Ll, 
 Mm, 
 Nn, 
 (NY Ny ny,  or ) 
 Ŋŋ, 
 Oo, 
 Pp, 
 (Qq )
 Rr, 
 Ss, 
 Tt, 
 Uu, 
 Vv, 
 Ww, 
 (Xx )
 Yy, 
 Zz,

Grammar 
Like most Bantu languages, Luganda's grammar can be said to be noun-centric, as most words in a sentence agree with a noun. Agreement is by gender and number and is indicated with prefixes attached to the start of word stems.
The following parts of speech agree with nouns in class and number:
 adjective
 verb (for subject and object roles)
 pronoun
 possessive

Noun classes
NB: In the study of Bantu languages the term noun class is often used to refer to what is called gender in comparative linguistics and in the study of certain other languages. Hereafter, both terms may be used.

There is some disagreement as to how to count Luganda's noun classes. Some authorities count singular and plural forms as two separate noun classes, but others treat the singular-plural pairs as genders. By the former method, there are 17 classes, and by the latter there are 10 since there are two pairs of classes with identical plurals and one class with no singular-plural distinction. The latter method is consistent with the study of non-Bantu languages. Applying the method to Luganda gives ten noun classes, nine of which have separate singular and plural forms. This is the usual way to discuss Luganda but not when discussing Bantu languages, generally.

The following table shows how the ten traditional classes of Luganda map onto the Proto-Bantu noun classes:

As the table shows, Proto-Bantu's polyplural classes (6 and 10) are treated as separate in this article.

As is the case with most languages, the distribution of nouns among the classes is essentially arbitrary, but there are some loose patterns:
 Class I contains mainly people, although some inanimate nouns can be found in this class:  'man',  'coffee'
 Class II contains all sorts of nouns but most of the concrete nouns in Class II are long or cylindrical. Most trees fall into this class:  'tree'
 Class III also contains many different types of concepts but most animals fall into this class:  'dog'
 Class IV contains inanimate objects and is the class used for the impersonal 'it':  'book'
 Class V contains mainly (but not exclusively) large things and liquids, and can also be used to create augmentatives:  'breast',  'giant' (from  'person')
 Class VI contains mainly small things and can be used to create diminutives, adjectival abstract nouns and (in the plural) negative verbal nouns and countries:  'puppy' (from  'dog'),  'laziness' (from  'lazy'),  'inaction, not to do' (from  'to do, act'),  'Britain, England' (from  'British, English person')
 Class VII contains many different things including the names of most languages:  'Ganda language',  'English language' (from  'European, white person')
 Class VIII is rarely used but can be used to create pejorative forms:  'mutt' (from  'dog')
 Class IX is mainly used for infinitives or affirmative verbal nouns:  'action, to do' (from the verb  'do, act')
 Class X, which has no singular–plural distinction, is used for mass nouns, usually in the sense of 'a drop' or 'precious little':  'drop of water' (from  'water'),  'sleep'

The class that a noun belongs to can usually be determined by its prefix:
 Class I: singular , plural 
 Class II: singular , plural 
 Class III: singular , plural 
 Class IV: singular , plural 
 Class VI: singular , plural 
 Class VII: singular , plural 
 Class VIII: singular , plural 
 Class IX: singular , plural 
 Class X: 

There are a few cases where prefixes overlap: the singulars of Classes I and II (both beginning with ); the singular of Class III and plurals of Classes III and VII (all beginning with ); and the plurals of Classes V and IX (both ). Genuine ambiguity, however, is rare, since even where the noun prefixes are the same, the other prefixes are often different. The same is true with the singular and plural of Class III:  'The dog is eating' vs  'The dogs are eating' (compare English The sheep is eating vs The sheep are eating where the noun is invariant but the verb distinguishes singular from plural).

In fact, the plurals of Classes III and VII, and those of Classes V and IX, are identical in all their prefixes (noun, verb, adjective etc.).

Class V uses its noun prefixes somewhat differently from the other classes. This happens when the stem begins with a single plosive, or a single nasal stop followed by a long vowel, a nasal stop and then a plosive (called a nasalised stem). For example:
  'egg'; plural  (from stem )
  'country'; plural  (from nasalised stem —the  becomes  when doubled)
  'cricket'; plural  (from nasalised stem —the  becomes  when doubled)

Other stems use the full prefix:
  'name'; plural  (from stem )
  'eye'; plural  (from stem )
  'battery'; plural  (from stem )

There are also some nouns that have no prefix. Their genders must simply be learnt by rote:
 Class I:  'gentleman, sir',  'madam',  'god',  'king',  (or ') 'tea',  'coffee'
 Class III:  'cat',  'gomesi (traditional East African women's formal dress)'

Adjectives, verbs, certain adverbs, the possessive and a few special forms of conjunctions are inflected to agree with nouns in Luganda.

Nouns 
Nouns are inflected for number and state.

Number is indicated by replacing the singular prefix with the plural prefix. For example,  'man',  'men';  'comb',  'combs'. All word classes agree with nouns in number and class.

State is similar to case but applies to verbs and other parts of speech as well as nouns, pronouns and adjectives. There are two states in Luganda, which may be called the base state and the topic state. The base state is unmarked and the topic state is indicated by the presence of the initial vowel.

The topic state is used for nouns in the following conditions:
 Subject of a sentence
 Object of an affirmative verb (other than the verb 'to be')

The base state is used for the following conditions:
 Object of a negative verb
 Object of a preposition
 Noun predicate (whether or not there's an explicit copula or verb 'to be')

Pronouns 
Luganda has a closed set of pronouns.

Personal Pronouns 
Luganda can have self-standing/independent personal pronouns and pronouns that are prefixed to the verb stem.

Self-Standing Pronouns 
 'I,me'
 'you'
 'he/she,him/her'
 'we,us'
 'you'
 'they,them'

Note that the sex/gender of referents is not distinguished so one has to be very careful how one translates Luganda pronouns into languages like English. For instance Ye musawo can be translated as "She is a doctor" or as "He is a doctor".

Adjectives 
As in other Niger–Congo languages (as well as most Indo-European and Afro-Asiatic languages), adjectives must agree in gender and number with the noun they qualify. For example:
  'beautiful girl' (Class I, singular)
  'beautiful girls' (Class I, plural)
  'beautiful tree' (Class II, singular)
  'beautiful trees' (Class II, plural)
  'beautiful/good car(s)' (Class V, singular/plural)

Attributive adjectives agree in state with the noun they qualify, but predicative adjectives never take the initial vowel. Similarly, the subject relative is formed by adding the initial vowel to the verb (because a main verb is a predicate).

Adverbs 
True adverbs in the grammatical sense are far rarer in Luganda than in, say, English, being mostly translated by other parts of speech—for example adjectives or particles.
When the adverb is qualifying a verb, it is usually translated by an adjective, which then agrees with the subject of the verb. For example:
  'She slanders me badly'
  'They slander me badly'
Here, 'badly' is translated with the adjective  'bad, ugly', which is declined to agree with the subject.

Other concepts can be translated by invariant particles. for example the intensifying particle  is attached to an adjective or verb to mean 'very', 'a lot'. For example:  'Lukwago drinks a lot'.

There are also two groups of true adverb in Luganda, both of which agree with the verbal subject or qualified noun (not just in gender and number but also in person), but which are inflected differently. The first group is conjugated in the same way as verbs and contains only a few words:  'how',  'like this',  'like that':
  'I speak like this'
  'Muslims pray like this'
  'The monkey eats like this'
  'Monkeys eat like this'
The adverb  'like this' (the last word in each of the above sentences) is conjugated as a verb to agree with the subject of the sentence in gender, number and person.

The second group takes a different set of prefixes, based on the pronouns. Adverbs in this group include  'all' (or, with the singular, 'any'),  'only',  'both' and  'all three':
  'I work alone'
  'Only I work'
  'Only you work'
  'Only I will buy the car'
  'I will only buy the car'
Note how, in the last two examples, the adverb  agrees with whichever antecedent it is qualifying — either the implicit  'I' or the explicit  'the car'.

Note also, in the first two examples, how the placement of  before or after the verb makes the difference between 'only' (when the adverb qualifies and agrees with the subject—the implicit  'I') and 'alone' (when it qualifies the verb  'I work' but agrees with the subject).

Possessive 
The possessive in Luganda is indicated with a different particle for each singular and plural noun class (according to the possessed noun). An alternative way of thinking about the Luganda possessive is as a single word whose initial consonant cluster is altered to agree with the possessed noun in class and number.

Depending on the possessed noun, the possessive takes one of the following forms:
 Singular , plural  (Class I)
 Singular , plural  (Class II)
 Singular , plural  (Class III)
 Singular , plural  (Class IV)
 Singular , plural  (Class V)
 Singular , plural  (Class VI)
 Singular , plural  (Class VII)
 Singular , plural  (Class VIII)
 Singular , plural  (Class IX)
  (Class X)

If the possessor is a personal pronoun, the separate possessive form is not used. Instead, the following personal possessives are used:
  'my',  'your (singular possessor)',  'his, her';  'our',  'your (plural possessor)',  'their' (Class I, singular possessed noun)
  'my',  'your (singular possessor)',  'his, her';  'our',  'your (plural possessor)',  'their' (Class I, plural possessed noun)
  'my',  'your (singular possessor)',  'his, her';  'our',  'your (plural possessor)',  'their' (Class II, singular possessed noun)
  'my',  'your (singular possessor)',  'his, her';  'our',  'your (plural possessor)'  'their' (Class II, plural possessed noun)
  'my',  'your', etc. (Class III, singular possessed noun)
 Etc.

There are also a few nouns that take special forms when used with a possessive:
  'my father',  'your (singular) father',  'his/her father'

Verbs

Subjects
As in other Bantu languages, every verb must also agree with its subject in gender and number (as opposed to number only as in Indo-European languages). For example:
  'the man is drinking' (Class I, singular)
  'the men are drinking' (Class I, plural)
  'the goat is drinking' (Class III, singular)
  'the goats are drinking' (Class III, plural)
  'the baby/infant is drinking' (Class VI, singular)
  'the babies/infants are drinking' (Class VI, plural)
Here, the verb  changes its prefix according to the gender and number of its subject.

Note, in the third and fourth examples, how the verb agrees with the number of the noun even when the noun doesn't explicitly reflect the number distinction.

The subject prefixes for the personal pronouns are:
 First person: singular  'I', plural  'we'
 Second person: singular  'you (singular)',  'you (plural)'
 Third person: singular  'he, she',  'they (Class I)'

For impersonal pronouns the subject prefixes are:
 Class I: singular , plural  (i.e. the third person prefixes shown directly above)
 Class II: singular , plural 
 Class III: singular , plural 
 Class IV: singular , plural 
 Class V: singular , plural 
 Class VI: singular , plural 
 Class VII: singular , plural 
 Class VIII: singular , plural 
 Class IX: singular , plural 
 Class X:

Objects
When the verb governs one or more objects, there is also an agreement between the object prefixes and the gender and number of their antecedents:
  'I drink it (e.g. coffee)' ( 'coffee', Class I singular)
  'I drink it (e.g. water)' ( 'water', Class IX plural)

As with the subject prefix, the third person prefixes also agree with their antecedents in person. The personal object prefixes are:
 First person: singular  'me', plural  'us'
 Second person: singular  'you (singular)',  'you (plural)'
 Third person: singular  'him, her',  'them (Class I)'

For the impersonal third person the object prefixes are:
 Class I: singular , plural  (i.e. the third person prefixes shown directly above)
 Class II: singular , plural 
 Class III: singular , plural 
 Class IV: singular , plural 
 Class V: singular , plural 
 Class VI: singular , plural 
 Class VII: singular , plural 
 Class VIII: singular , plural 
 Class IX: singular , plural 
 Class X: 

Note the similarity between each subject prefix and the corresponding object prefix: they are the same in all cases except Class I and the singular of Class III.

The direct object prefix is usually inserted directly after the subject prefix:
  'I have eaten it' ( subject 'I' +  object 'it' +  verb 'ate')

The indirect object prefix comes after the direct object:
  'I have given it to him' ( subject 'I' +  object 'it' +  object '(to) him' +  verb 'gave')

Negative 
This results in the following set of personal subject prefixes:
 First person: singular  'I', plural  'we'
 Second person: singular  'you (singular)',  'you (plural)'
 Third person: singular  'he, she',  'they (Class I)'

The negative impersonal subject prefixes are:
 Class I: singular , plural  (i.e. the third person prefixes shown directly above)
 Class II: singular , plural 
 Class III: singular , plural 
 Class IV: singular , plural 
 Class V: singular , plural 
 Class VI: singular , plural 
 Class VII: singular , plural 
 Class VIII: singular , plural 
 Class IX: singular , plural 
 Class X: 

When used with object relatives or the narrative tense (see below), the negative is formed with the prefix , which is inserted after the subject and object affixes:
  'The person whom I saw'
  'The person whom I didn't see'

Modified stems
To form some tenses, a special form of the verb stem, called the 'modified form', is used. This is formed by making various changes to the final syllable of the stem, usually involving either changing the final syllable to one of the following suffixes:
 
 
 
 
 
 
 
 
 
 
 

The modified form of verb stems is the only real source of irregularity in Luganda's verbal system. Monosyllabic verbs, in particular, have unpredictable modified forms:
  'to be' 
  'to die' 
  'to deny, forbid' 
  'to end' (intransitive) 
  'to remove'  or 
  'to cook' (intransitive) 
  'to fall' 
  'to come' 
  'to go down, come down' 
  'to catch' 
  'to delay' 
  'to eat' 
  'to find out, realise' 
  'to drink' 
  'to release' 
  'to put' 
  'to kill' 
  'to take' 
  'to be afraid' 
  'to come from' 
  'to give' 
  'to call' 
  'to pass'

Tense and mood 
Tense–aspect–mood in Luganda is explicitly marked on the verb, as it is in most other Bantu languages.

Present tense

The present tense is formed by simply adding the subject prefixes to the stem.  The negative is formed in the same way but with the negative subject prefixes (this is the usual way of forming the negative in Luganda).

The present perfect is just the subject prefix plus the modified stem:
  'I have done'
  'you have done'
  'he, she has done'
  'we have done'
  'you (plural) have done'
  'they (class I) have done'

The present perfect in Luganda is sometimes slightly weaker in its past meaning than in English. It is often used with intransitive verbs with the sense of being in the state of having done something. For example,  means 'my husband has arrived' (using the present perfect form  of the verb  'to come');  usually means 'I'm off' rather than 'I have gone'. But to say I have done in Muganda would usually use one of the past tenses  or  'I did' because  is a transitive verb.

The present perfect is also used to show physical attitude. For example, using the verb  'to sit down':  (present tense) means 'I am in the process of sitting myself down'; to say 'I'm sitting down' in the usual sense of 'I'm seated' in standard English, a Muganda would use the present perfect:  (as in certain non-standard varieties of British English).

Past tenses
The near past is formed by inserting the prefix  before the modified form of the stem. This prefix, being a vowel, has the effect of changing the form of the subject prefixes:
  'I did'
  'you did'
  'he, she did'
  'we did'
  'you (plural) did'
  'they (class I) did'
 ...

The near past tense is used for events that have happened in the past 18 hours. The negative is formed in the usual way.

The far past is formed with the same prefix  as the near past, but using the simple form of the stem:
  'I did'
  'you did'
  'he, she did'
  'we did'
  'you (plural) did'
  'they (class I) did'
 ...

The far past tense is used for events that happened more than 18 hours ago, and can also be used as a weak pluperfect. This is the tense that's used in novels and storytelling.

Future tenses
The near future is used when describing things that are going to happen within the next 18 hours. It is formed with the prefix  on the simple form of the stem:
  'I shall do'
  'you will do'
  'he, she will do'
  'we shall do'
  'you (plural) will do'
  'they (class I) will do'
  'they (class III) will do'
  'they (class III) will do'
 ...

  'I shan't do'
  'you won't do'
  'he, she won't do'
  'we shan't do'
  'you (plural) won't do'
  'they (class I) won't do'
  'it (class II) won't do'
  'they (class II) won't do'
  'he, she, it (class III) won't do'
  'they (class III) won't do'
 ...

The far future is used for events that will take place more than 18 hours in the future. It is formed with the prefix  on the simple form of the stem:
  'I shall do'
  'you will do'
  'he, she will do'
  'we shall do'
  'you (plural) will do'
  'they (class I) will do'
 ...

Other
The conditional mood is formed with the prefix  and the modified form of the stem:
  'I would do'
  'you would do'
  'he, she would do'
  'we would do'
  'you (plural) would do'
  'they (class I) would do'

The subjunctive is formed by changing the final  of the stem to an :
  'I may do'
  'you may do'
  'he, she may do'
  'we may do'
  'you may do'
  'they may do'

The negative is formed either with the auxiliary verb  ('to fail') plus the infinitive:
  'I may not do'
  'you may not do'
  'he, she may not do'
  'we may not do'
  'you may not do'
  'they may not do'

or using the same forms as the negative of the near future:
  'I may not do'
  'you may not do'
  'he, she may not do'
  'we may not do'
  'you may not do'
  'they may not do'

Luganda has some special tenses not found in many other languages. The 'still' tense is used to say that something is still happening. It is formed with the prefix :
  'I'm still doing'
  'you're still doing'
  'he, she is still doing'
  'we're still doing'
  'you're still doing'
  'they're still doing'

In the negative it means 'no longer':
  'I'm no longer doing'
  'you're no longer doing'
  'he, she is no longer doing'
  'we're no longer doing'
  'you're no longer doing'
  'they're no longer doing'

With intransitive verbs, especially verbs of physical attitude (see Present Perfect above), the  prefix can also be used with the modified verb stem to give a sense of 'still being in a state'. For example,  means 'I'm still seated'.

The 'so far' tense is used when talking about what has happened so far, with the implication that more is to come. It is formed with the prefix :
  'I have so far done'
  'you have so far done'
  'he, she has so far done'
  'we have so far done'
  'you have so far done'
  'they have so far done'

This tense is found only in the affirmative.

The 'not yet' tense, on the other hand, is found only in the negative. It is used to talk about things that have not happened yet (but which may well happen in the future), and is formed with the prefix :
  'I haven't yet done'
  'you haven't yet done'
  'he, she hasn't yet done'
  'we haven't yet done'
  'you haven't yet done'
  'they haven't yet done'

When describing a series of events that happen (or will or did happen) sequentially, the narrative form is used for all but the first verb in the sentence. It’s formed by the particle  (or  before a vowel) followed by the present tense:
  'I went and made a phone call'
  'I’ll go and make a phone call'

The narrative can be used with any tense, as long as the events it describes are in immediate sequence. The negative is formed with the prefix  placed immediately after the object prefixes (or after the subject prefix if no object prefixes are used):
  'I didn't go and did not make a phone call'
  'I won't go and will not make a phone call'
  'I haven't gone to make it yet'

Compare this with the negative construction used with the object relatives.

Auxiliary verbs 
Other tenses can be formed periphrastically, with the use of auxiliary verbs. Some of Luganda's auxiliary verbs can also be used as main verbs; some are always auxiliaries:
  'to be': used with an optional  with another finite verb to form compound tenses
  'to come': forms a future tense when used with the infinitive of the main verb
  (only used as an auxiliary): used with the infinitive of the main verb to mean (in the present tense) 'to tend to' or (in the near future) 'about to'
  'to come from': followed by the main verb in the infinitive, means 'just been'
  'to fail': used with the infinitive to form negatives

Derivational affixes 
The meaning of a verb can be altered in an almost unlimited number of ways by means of modifications to the verb stem. There are only a handful of core derivational modifications, but these can be added to the verb stem in virtually any combination, resulting in hundreds of possible compound modifications.

  'to see' →  'to be seen'

The reflexive is created by adding the prefix  to the verb stem (equivalent to replacing the  prefix of the infinitive with ):
  'to kill' →  'to kill oneself'

Many verbs are used only in their reflexive form:
  'to sleep' (simple form * is not used)
  'to need' (simple form * is not used)

Reduplication is formed by doubling the stem, and generally adds the sense of repetition or intensity:
  'to strike' →  'to batter'

The applied, or prepositional, modification, allows the verb to take an extra object and gives it the meaning 'to do for or with (someone or something)'. It is formed with the suffix  inserted before the final  of the verb:
  'to work' →  'to work for (an employer)'
  'to sleep' →  'to sleep on (e.g. a piece of furniture)'

Adding the applied suffix twice gives the 'augmentative applied' modification, which has an alternative applied sense, usually further removed from the original sense than the simple applied modification:
  'to work' →  'to utilise, employ'

It gives a verb the sense of 'to cause to do', and can also make an intransitive verb transitive:
  'to see' →  'to show' (more commonly "okulaga", a different verb, is used).
  'to become' →  'to turn (something or someone) into (something else)'

Applying two causative modifications results in the 'second causative':
  'to see' →  'to show' →  'to cause to show'

The neuter modification, also known as the stative, is similar to the '-able' suffix in English, except that the result is a verb meaning 'to be x-able' rather than an adjective meaning x-able'. It is formed by inserting the suffix / before the verb's final :
  'to do' →  'to be possible'
  'to eat' →  'to be edible'

The intransitive conversive modification reverses the meaning of an intransitive verb and leaves it intransitive, or reverses the meaning of a transitive verb and makes it intransitive, similar to English's 'un-' prefix. It is formed with the prefix  inserted before the verb's final :
  'to pay a visit' →  'to end one's visit, to depart'

The transitive conversive is similar to the intransitive conversive except that it results in a transitive verb. In other words, it reverses the meaning of an intransitive verb and makes it transitive, or reverses the meaning of a transitive verb and leaves it transitive. It is formed with the suffix :
  'to do' →  'to undo'
  'to plant' →  'to uproot'
  'to pay a visit' →  'to send off'

Two conversive suffixes create the augmentative conversive modification:
  'to deceive' →  'to disabuse, set straight'

  'to see' →  'to see one another'
  'to kill' →  'to kill each other'

The progressive is formed with the suffix . It is used with finite verbs to give the sense of continuousness:
  'I'll look after him' →  'I'll always look after him'
  'don't whinge' →  'never whinge'
   'don't steal' →   'thou shalt not steal'

This is not really a modification but a clitic, so it is always applied 'after' any grammatical inflexions.

Combinations of modifications 
More than one modification can be made to a single stem:
  'to be undo-able (i.e. reversible)' — conversive neuter:  →  → 
  'to transplant' — conversive applied causative:  →  →  → 
  'to look around oneself, be distracted' — reduplicative reciprocal:  →  → 
  'to distract' — reduplicative reciprocal causative:  →  →  → 
  'to pretend to sleep' — reflexive augmentative applied causative  →  →  (applied) →  (augmentative applied) → 

There are some restrictions that apply to the combinations in which these modifications can be made. For example, the 'applied' modification can't be made to a causative stem; any causative modifications must first be removed, the applied modification made and the causative modifications then reapplied. And since the reflexive is formed with a prefix rather than a suffix, it is impossible to distinguish between, for example, reflexive causative and causative reflexive.

Numbers 
The Luganda system of cardinal numbers is quite complicated. The numbers 'one' to 'five' are specialised numerical adjectives that agree with the noun they qualify. The words for 'six' to 'ten' are numerical nouns that don't agree with the qualified noun.

'Twenty' to 'fifty' are expressed as multiples of ten using the cardinal numbers for 'two' to 'five' with the plural of 'ten'. 'Sixty' to 'one hundred' are numerical nouns in their own right, derived from the same roots as the nouns for 'six' to 'ten' but with different class prefixes.

In a similar pattern, 'two hundred' to 'five hundred' are expressed as multiples of a hundred using the cardinal numbers with the plural of 'hundred'. Then 'six hundred' to 'one thousand' are nouns, again derived from the same roots as 'six' to 'ten'. The pattern repeats up to 'ten thousand', then standard nouns are used for 'ten thousand', 'one hundred thousand' and 'one million'.

The words used for this system are:

Numerical adjectives (declined to agree with the qualified noun):
  (...) 'one'
  (...) 'two'
  (...) 'three'
  (...) 'four'
  (...) 'five'
Numerical nouns:
 'Six' to 'ten' (Classes II and V)
  'six' (Class II)
  'seven'
  'eight'
  'nine'
  'ten'; plural  (Class V)
 'Sixty' to 'one hundred' (Classes III and IV)
  'sixty' (Class III)
  'seventy'
  'eighty' (Class IV)
  'ninety'
  'one hundred'; plural 
 'Six hundred' to 'one thousand' (Class VII)
  'six hundred'
  'seven hundred'
  'eight hundred'
  'nine hundred'
  'one thousand'; plural 
 'Six thousand' to 'ten thousand' (Class VI)
  'six thousand'
  'seven thousand'
  'eight thousand'
  'nine thousand'
 (archaic)  'ten thousand'; plural 
Standard nouns:
  'ten thousand'; plural  (Class II)
  'one hundred thousand'; plural  (Class VI)
  'one million'; plural  (Class VI)
  'one billion' (1,000,000,000); plural  (Class VI)
  'one trillion' (1,000,000,000,000); plural  
  'one quintillion' (1,000,000,000,000,000,000); plural  (Class VI)
  'one septillion' (1,000,000,000,000,000,000,000,000); plural  (Class VI)

For example:
 12  (10 + 2)
 22  (10 × 2 + 2)
 65  (60 + 5)
 122  (100 + 10 × 2 + 2)
 222  (100 × 2 + 10 × 2 + 2)
 1,222  (1,000 + 100 × 2 + 10 × 2 + 2)
 1,024  (1,000 + 10 × 2 + 4)
 2,222  (1,000 × 2 + 100 × 2 + 10 × 2 + 2)
 2,500  (1,000 × 2 + 100 × 5)
 7,500  (7,000 + 100 × 5)
 7,600  (7,000 + 600)
 9,999  (9,000 + 900 + 90 + 9)
 999,000 
 1,000,000  (1,000,000)
 3,000,000  (1,000,000 × 3)
 10,000,000  (1,000,000 × 10)
 122,000,122  (1,000,000 * (100 + 10 × 2 + 2) + 100 + 10 × 2 + 2)

The numerical adjectives agree with the qualified noun:
  'one car' (Class III)
  'one woman' (Class I)
  'five cars'
  'five women'
but
  'a hundred cars'
  'a hundred women'
and
  'eleven men' (Class I)
  'eleven cattle' (Class III)

However, a complication arises from the agreement of numerical adjectives with the powers of ten. Since the words for 'ten', 'hundred', 'thousand' and so on belong to different classes, each power of ten can be inferred from the form of the adjective qualifying it, so the plural forms of the powers of ten ( 'tens',  'hundreds',  'tens of thousands' — but not  'thousands') are usually omitted, as long as this doesn't result in ambiguity.

For example:
 40  → 
 22  → 
 222  → 
 1,024  → 
 2,222  → 
 2,500  → 
 7,500  → 
 122,000,122  → 

Note that:
  'thousands' is also not usually omitted because the form the numerical adjectives take when qualifying it is the same as the counting form, so 3,000 will always be rendered .

Sample text 
Abantu bazaalibwa nga balina eddembe n'obuyinza ebyenkanankana, batondebwa nga balina amagezi era nga basobola okwawula ekirungi n'ekibi bwebatyo, buli omu agwana okuyisa munne nga muganda we.

Translation 
All human beings are born free and equal in dignity and rights. They are endowed with reason and conscience and should act towards one another in a spirit of brotherhood.

(Article 1 of the Universal Declaration of Human Rights)

References

Bibliography
 Ashton, Ethel O., and others (1954) A Luganda Grammar, London: Longmans, Green.
 Barlon, W. Kimuli (2009) Luganda Language: A connection with Nyanja of Zambia. pp. 04
 Chesswas, J. D. (1963) Essentials of Luganda. Oxford University Press
 Crabtree, W. A. (1902, 1923) Elements of Luganda Grammar. The Uganda Bookshop/Society for Promoting Christian Knowledge
 Dutcher, Katharine & Mary Paster (2008), "Contour Tone Distribution in Luganda" Proceedings of the 27th West Coast Conference on Formal Linguistics, ed. Natasha Abner and Jason Bishop, 123-131. Somerville, MA: Cascadilla Proceedings Project.
 Hubbard, Kathleen (1995) "Toward a theory of phonological and phonetic timing: evidence from Bantu". In Connell, Bruce & Amalia Arvanti (eds), Phonology and Phonetic Evidence: Papers in Laboratory Phonology IV pp. 168–187.
 Hyman, Larry & Francis Katamba (1993) "A new approach to tone in Luganda", in Language. 69. 1. pp. 33–67
 Hyman, Larry & Francis Katamba (2001) "The Word in Luganda"
 Kamoga, F.K. & Stevick, E.W. (1968). Luganda Basic Course . Foreign Service Institute, Washington. Sound files of this course are available free on the Internet.
 Kamoga, F.K & Stevick, E.W. (1968). Luganda Pretraining Program. Foreign Service Institute, Washington. 
 Murphy, John D. (1972) Luganda-English Dictionary. Catholic University of America Press.
 Pilkington, G.L. (1911) The Hand-Book Of Luganda. SPCK.
 Snoxall, R.A. (1967) Luganda-English Dictionary. Clarendon Press, Oxford

External links 

 An excellent online summary of the Luganda language can be found at http://www.buganda.com/luganda.htm.
 Free online Luganda Dictionary on the Ganda Ancestry website https://web.archive.org/web/20080122111606/http://www.gandaancestry.com/dictionary/dictionary.php
 Free online talking Luganda Dictionary and Crossword Puzzle on the Ganda portal http://www.GandaSpace.com
 English–Luganda Dictionary for printing (24 pages, A5)
 Luganda–English Dictionary
 The website of a team developing Luganda language capability for computers is at https://archive.today/20011115110455/http://www.kizito.uklinux.net/
 Paradisec open access collection of recordings in Luganda

 
Buganda
Languages of Uganda
Nyoro-Ganda languages
Subject–verb–object languages